Helene Louise "Helli" Stehle (6 December 1907 – 27 August 2017) was a Swiss actress and radio presenter.

Biography
Stehle was born on 6 December 1907 in Basel, Switzerland. She first achieved fame in Switzerland as a stage actress. She later began working in radio, performing and directing plays and reciting poetry for the state-run radio station, Radiostudio Basel, in her native Basel. In 1939, she became Switzerland's first female newscaster. She never married or had children as - in those days - only single women were allowed to work in state jobs. She was the first female spokesman in Radio Beromünster (now known as Radio SRF).

She turned 100 in December 2007. When she died at 109, she was the oldest living person in Switzerland.

See also
List of centenarians (actors, filmmakers and entertainers)

References

External links

 Reportage über Helli Stehle (2008) 
 Bericht anlässlich von Stehles 103. Geburtstag mit Radiosendung von 1997 
Erste Radiosprecherin der Schweiz feiert ihren 100. Geburtstag 

1907 births
2017 deaths
Swiss film actresses
20th-century Swiss actresses
Swiss centenarians
Women centenarians
Actors from Basel-Stadt